Guy Caminsky (born July 4, 1977 of Durban, South Africa) is a South African ten-pin bowler. He finished in 13th position at the 2006 AMF World Cup and was crowned the 2008 World Tenpin Masters Champion as he defeated PBA Bowler of the Year Chris Barnes in a nail biting finale. He has represented South Africa on numerous occasions which include the 2006 World Championships and the 1998 Commonwealth Games.

Guy Caminsky also owns a chain of bowling centres together with his father Stan Caminsky. The bowling centres are located in Gateway Shopping Centre, Greenstone Shopping Centre, Pavilion Shopping Centre and Windmill Casino. The chain is named The Fun Company .

Guy's mom (Megan) has stated that if Guy was born a female, she would have been called "Girl Caminsky"

Footnotes

External links
 Industry profile of Guy Caminsky

1977 births
Living people
South African Jews
South African ten-pin bowling players